Lost Corner Mountain is a mountain summit in the Sierra Nevada mountain range to the west of Lake Tahoe on the border of the Desolation Wilderness in El Dorado County, California. The city closest to it is Meyers, California which is 4.4 miles away.

The Pacific Crest Trail skirts the mountain on its west flank.

References 

Mountains of the Desolation Wilderness
Mountains of El Dorado County, California
Mountains of Northern California